KCUN-LP is a Country and Texas Red Dirt formatted broadcast radio station licensed to and serving Livingston, Texas. KCUN-LP is owned and operated by HGN Music & Education Foundation.

References

External links
 

2014 establishments in Texas
Country radio stations in the United States
Radio stations established in 2014
CUN-LP
CUN-LP